Gadobangkong Station (GK) is a railway station located in Gadobangkong, Ngamprah, West Bandung Regency. The station, which is located at an altitude of +695 meters (previously +713 m), is included in the Bandung Operational Area II. The station is located not far from Jl. Raya Cimahi-Padalarang. Gadobangkong is the station closest to the regency seat and is the most eastern station in West Bandung Regency.

Services 
The following is a list of train services at the Gadobangkong Station.

Passenger services 
Local economy
Lokal Bandung Raya, destination of – as well as from and purpose – (only most of the specific itinerary)

Intermodal support

References

External links 

West Bandung Regency
Railway stations in West Java
Railway stations opened in 1884